Powder Mountain is a ski resort east of Eden, Utah, stretching between Weber and Cache counties and  from Salt Lake City International Airport. Covering , Powder Mountain is the largest ski resort in the US by skiable acreage. The resort has 154 trails, nine lifts, and two terrain parks.

History
Powder Mountain had been the winter range for Frederick James Cobabe's sheep. Between 1902 and 1948, Cobabe accumulated land around Eden and improved its previous poor land management. The area has been called "one of the best-managed watersheds in the Wasatch Mountains".

Cobabe's son Alvin bought his father's livestock company (with its 8,000 acres) in 1948, and later acquired adjacent properties. When he opened Powder Mountain on February 19, 1972, he owned 14,000 acres.

During the resort's first season, the Sundown lift was the only one in operation. The area was illuminated for night skiing, a ski school was established, and food was prepared on an outdoor barbecue. The main and Sundown lodges and the Timberline lift were added during the 1972–73 season.

Alvin Cobabe sold Powder Mountain in 2006 to Western American Holdings. The resort remained under the same management team, led by Aleta Cobabe (Alvin's daughter) during the 2006–07 season. It was purchased by Summit, an event-hosting group, in 2013.

Timeline
 Powder Mountain opens with the Sundown Lift; ski school begins.
 Main and Sundown lodges and Timberline Lift open.
 Hidden Lake Lift added.
 Shuttle service for employees and for Powder Country begin.
 Powder Mountain is the first Utah resort to permit snowboarding.
 Hidden Lake Day Lodge opens.
 Sunrise Lift opens.
 The quad Paradise Lift opens an additional  of lift-accessed terrain. Snowcatat skiing moves to Lightning Ridge, accessing an additional  acres.
 A high-speed lift replaces the Hidden Lake Lift.
 Summit purchases Powder Mountain.
 The Village Lift and Mary's Lift Skytrac Systems are added.

Powder Mountain has six chairlifts (one triple, four fixed quad, and one detachable quad) and three surface tows. Beyond its lift-accessed terrain, it can also be accessed by snowcat, cat skiing and guided tours. Snowcat service is available for Lightning Ridge, near James Peak .

Powder Mountain is co-owned by Elliott Bisnow, Brett Leve, Jeremy Schwartz, and Jeff Rosenthal.

References

External links

Powder Mountain webpage
Ski Utah website
Powder Mountain Ski Resort Summit

Ski areas and resorts in Utah
Sports venues in Cache County, Utah
Sports venues in Weber County, Utah
Sports venues completed in 1972
1972 establishments in Utah